Resvoll is a surname. Notable people with the surname include:

 The Resvoll sisters, Norwegian botanists:
 Hanna Resvoll-Holmsen (1873–1943)
 Thekla Resvoll (1871–1948)